Fernando Quetzalcóatl Moctezuma Pereda (born 9 April 1956) is a Mexican politician affiliated with the Institutional Revolutionary Party. He served as Deputy of the LX Legislature of the Mexican Congress representing Hidalgo. He previously served in the Congress of Hidalgo from 1993 to 1996 and 2002 to 2005.

References

1956 births
Living people
Politicians from Hidalgo (state)
Institutional Revolutionary Party politicians
21st-century Mexican politicians
Members of the Congress of Hidalgo
20th-century Mexican politicians
Deputies of the LX Legislature of Mexico
Members of the Chamber of Deputies (Mexico) for Hidalgo (state)